Tukhin is a village in Kalininsky District of Tver Oblast, Russia.

References

Rural localities in Kalininsky District